British records in athletics are the best performances in athletics events by athletes representing the United Kingdom which are ratified by UK Athletics (UKA).

History
The idea of a "British Record" was instituted by the AAA in 1887 for performance made in the United Kingdom, by athletes from anywhere in the world. This type of record was superseded in 1948 by the British (All-Comers') Record, and then by the United Kingdom (All-Comers') Record in 1960.

A "British (National) Record" was instituted by the British Amateur Athletic Board (BAAB) in 1948 for performances made in the United Kingdom, by athletes born in the British Commonwealth. This record type was discontinued in 1960 when the BAAB instituted "United Kingdom (National) Records" which defined performances made anywhere in the world by athletes eligible to represent the United Kingdom in international competition.

Alongside this, the AAA defined "English Native Records" in 1928 as performances made in England or Wales by athletes born in England or Wales. This was superseded in 1960 by "AAA National Records" – performances made in England or Wales by athletes born in England or Wales, or by bona fide members of clubs under the jurisdiction of the AAA whose fathers were born in England or Wales.

Key to tables

Performances marked with an asterisk (*) maybe a) not ratifiable or b) currently under further review

+ = en route to a longer distance

A = affected by altitude

! = timing by photo-electric cell

a = aided road course according to IAAF rule 260.28

Mx = mark was made in a mixed race

X = annulled due to doping violation

# = not recognised by federation

est = estimate

Outdoor

Men

Walking

Women

Mixed

Road

Men

Walking

Women

Indoor

Men

Women

Notes

References
General
UK Men Outdoor Records 4 February 2023 updated
UK Women Outdoor Records 4 February 2023 updated
UK Men Indoor Records 4 February 2023 updated
UK Women Indoor Records 4 February 2023 updated
Specific

External links
 UKA web site
 World and Various UK Athletics Records

Athletics in the United Kingdom
Athletics
National records in athletics (track and field)
United Kingdom sport-related lists